EICMA (Esposizione Internazionale Ciclo Motociclo e Accessori), or the Milan Motorcycle Shows is an annual trade show in Milan, Italy featuring motorcycles. The 2018 show drew over half a million visitors and more than 1,200 exhibiting brands. The show is frequently used by manufacturers to debut new models.

Organised by EICMA, editions take place every year in Milan, Italy and last for six days in total. Fiera Milano Rho admits trade visitors for the first two days and then is open for the general public on the latter four days. Opening hours for trade visitors are from 08:30 on the first day and 09:00 on the second until 18:30 for both days. For the general public, opening hours start from 09:30 for all days until 18:30. The only exception is the fourth day, when closing time is at 22:00.

References

External links

 EICMA Official Website

Motorcycle shows
Trade fairs in Italy
Autumn events in Italy